Hotel World is a postmodern novel, influenced by modernist novels, written by Ali Smith. The novel portrays the stages of grief in relation to the passage of time. It won both the Scottish Arts Council Book Award (2001) and the Encore Award (2002).

Plot introduction
There are five characters, two relatives, three strangers, but all female. There is a homeless woman, a hotel receptionist, a hotel critic, the ghost of a hotel chambermaid, and the ghost's sister. These women tell a story, and it is through this story that unbeknownst to them their lives and fates intersect. The catalyst of their story is the Global Hotel.

Explanation of the novel's title
The title of Ali Smith's novel Hotel World is a metaphor for life's passage through time, and the moments which escape us all too quickly. Every hour of every day, a hotel somewhere is checking in a new guest, or “life”, just as quickly as one is checking out. In titling her novel Hotel World, Smith not only references the homogeneity imposed on society through hotel corporations, but also emphasizes an impermanent or indefinite state in life. The question then arises of what life would be if we were mere observers, watching countless lives check in and out of this same predetermined world, this hotel world. Does the presence or absence of those we love shape the moments that mould our world?

Plot summary
Hotel World is divided into five sections. The first section, “Past” tells the story of Sara Wilby

The second part, "Present Historic", is about a homeless girl (Else) begging for money outside the Hotel.

The “Future Conditional”, the third section of the novel, Lise, a receptionist.

The fourth part is “Perfect” with its far from perfect character Penny.

The fifth section of the novel titled “Future in the Past,” is entirely Clare's memories on the life and death of her sister Sara.

“Present” is the title of the last part of the novel.

Characters in "Hotel World"
Hotel World is told from the perspective of five different women who as fate would have it cross paths and in doing so affect each other's lives through moments spent together. Each character is unique in that they each signify a different stage of the grieving process, a theme prevalent throughout the entire novel.

Sara Wilby – a teenage hotel chambermaid who has fallen to her death in a hotel dumbwaiter. She is the daughter to her parents Mr. and Mrs. Wilby, and also older sister to Clare.

Elspeth Freeman – an older homeless woman suffering from tuberculosis, she daily sits on the streets begging the people passing by to “spare some change.” When first introduced to the reader, Elspeth is referred to only as Else. The character of Else signifies anger, the second stage in the grieving process.

Lise – a receptionist for the Global Hotel, Lise was responsible for inviting Else, the homeless woman, to spend a night there.

Penny Warner – A reporter and journalist, Penny is a paying guest to the Global Hotel, there to review its services.

Clare Wilby – the younger sister to Sara, Clare is not entirely introduced until the last section of the novel. Clare's character signifies the final stage in the grieving process, that of acceptance.

Duncan – He was the sole witness to Sara's death. As the novel's only dominant male character, Duncan appears in each story within the novel. He too is moved to an emotional state of depression after witnessing the tragedy. Including Duncan in each of the novel's stories, Smith seems to imply that these stages of grief may affect mere observers too, that these stages are not exclusive to family or close personal friends of those who have died.

Major themes

Grief
The sudden death of Sara Wilby transforms this novel into a healing process. It both signifies and addresses each stage in grieving.

Passage of Time
In one moment one life has ended. In one night a woman's status has changed. In six months depression deteriorates the mind. And through the course of time, a sister's acceptance is gained. All these individual experiences characterize moments endured by Smith's characters in her novel Hotel World. The experience of these moments and the passage of time that they represent express the theme that time truly is of the essence. Just as quickly as these moments shape a life, they leave a life too, never returned. When then don't we live when given the chance, and why is it that in dying one never feels more alive? Smith addresses these questions through her formal writing choices. Her sentence structure or complete lack of structure, the immediacy she imparts on her text, the words she chooses to forget, and the way she structures her novel's chapters as grammatical tenses of time all communicate the sense that time is passing. Moments pass by, memories are made then forgotten, people continue to check in and out, and time is the only thing keeping track. “What a life. What a time. What I felt. Then. Gone.” (3).

Sexuality/Sexual awakening (lesbian)
Though it never comes to fruition in the novel, Sara Wilby's sexual awakening when she meets the girl in the watch shop—and the girl's shared interest in Sara, which is only conveyed briefly near the end of the novel—reveal a very internal coming out process for both women as each recognizes in herself her potential as a sexual being attracted to the same sex. Sara Wilby's early reluctant awareness of her attraction, and her subsequent somewhat obsessive observing of the watch shop girl, echo the recurring theme of watching and observing in the novel, and simultaneously convey the hope and complexity associated with recognizing one's queer self.

Societal Acceptance
Smith uses unique characteristics for each woman giving her novel the feeling of being an observation on society.

Homogeneous Society
Smith explores the idea of a homogeneous society by focusing her plot on the world of a hotel. A hotel corporation implies a sense of sameness. Regardless of location, the service provided, the architecture of their buildings, and the ideal life they attempt to sell, hotel corporations all mimic each other. Forcing a false reality on its visitors, hotels act as a pause in time. Continually checking in and out, guests never achieve a sense of permanence in their stay, thus never find a home in a hotel. While hotels strive for homogeneity, there is nothing real or pure behind their corporations. Smith is not only critiquing this but also commenting that if homogeneity was achieved in actual society there would be no purity left.

Hierarchal Society
Smith implies there is a hierarchical structure to society, by setting her entire novel in a luxurious hotel.

Literary significance and reception
Acclaimed as a truly inventive novel, Hotel World received much praise for its unique storyline and distinct formal choices. Garnered as a rare novel filled with hope and despair, Hotel World’s characters, linguistic choices, and thematic elements are what have set it apart as a genuinely modernist -- and some would argue postmodern -- piece of literature.

Allusions and references
Ali Smith includes several quotes and short poems at the start of the book which are reflective of the themes of the novel.

Muriel Spark says “remember you must die” (in her 1959 novel Memento Mori) meaning people should appreciate life to its full potential because it will one day end. This quote ties into the theme about the passage of time, and is also reminiscent of Smith's recurrent “remember you must live.”
William Blake describes “Energy” as being “eternal delight.” Ghosts are thought by some to be the body's energy which forever preserved, which means that a ghost, or any form of life after death, is thus viewed as eternally delightful because they will persist forever.
Edwin Muir’s poem that speaks about the “unfriendly universe” also ties into the theme of the passage of time. It describes "the miracle” as being the point where people are able to let go.

Smith also makes reference to Todd Solondz's 1998 film Happiness, a controversial film which deals with sexuality and isolation and their difficult relationship to each other.

Awards and nominations
Shortlisted for the Booker Prize for Fiction 2001
Shortlisted for the Orange Prize for Fiction 2001
Received the Scottish Arts Council Book Award 2001  
Received the Scottish Arts Council Book of the Year Award 2002
Received the Encore Award 2002

Adaptations
Recently adapted to the stage by Kidbrooke secondary school and performed at Greenwich Theatre and the 2007 Edinburgh Festival Fringe.

References

Sources

External links

Reviews
 Check in, drop out—Ali Smith plays with literary theory in Hotel World review by Giles Foden for The Guardian
 The Ghost in the Minibar review by Michael Upchurch for The New York Times
 Maid's nostalgic ghost makes a haunting narrator / Novel's life-and-death ambiguities add to its complexity review by Alexandra Yurkovsky for San Francisco Chronicle
 Review by Charles Taylor for Salon (website)

2001 British novels
Scottish novels
Novels set in hotels
Hamish Hamilton books